Bondage tape is a  and  strip of thin plastic material (PVC in most cases) that adheres only to itself, without any adhesive; it is typically intended to be used in erotic bondage.  Since it does not stick to the hair or skin, a bottom can be tightly bound or gagged without causing harm when the tape is removed.

Bondage tape is a versatile part of BDSM gear, and it's suited for beginners and for more experienced BDSM practitioners. It's safe and easy to use, and compared to bondage rope, one does not need to know any bondage knots to use it effectively.

Bondage tape can be used as:

 blindfold
 mouth gag
 handcuffs
 whole body restraint
 body-to-furniture restraint
 a tool for forced orgasm sessions in combination with magic wand
 lingerie

Some tape is thick enough that it can be unwound, unwrinkled and rewound for reuse, but usually it is simply and quickly removed by cutting it with blunt-tipped scissors.

If the tape is applied relatively flat on the body, the risk of losing circulation is minimal.  Unless the top has sufficiently practiced with it, the tape can become easily twisted tight, becoming like plastic string and increasing the possibility of pinching and a loss of circulation.

This type of tape is also commonly used for stretching a body piercing.

See also
 Cohesive bandage
 List of adhesive tapes
 List of BDSM equipment

References

Physical restraint
BDSM equipment